The UNSW School of Computer Science and Engineering (CSE) is part of the UNSW Faculty of Engineering and was founded in 1991 out of the former Department of Computer Science within the School of Electrical Engineering and Computer Science. It is the highest ranked and largest School of its kind in Australia. The academic staff have research focus in areas such as Artificial Intelligence, Biomedical Image Computing, Data Knowledge, Embedded Systems, Networked Systems and Security, Programming Languages and Compilers, Service Oriented Computing, Theoretical Computer Science and Trustworthy Systems.

UNSW was a founding member of National ICT Australia (NICTA), which merged with CSIRO in 2015 to form Data61. CSE maintains strong ties with Data61.

The school has a number of notable alumni and former staff, including Associate Professor John Lions the author of the commentary on the UNIX operating system, a two-volume book entitled, a Source Code and Commentary on Unix Level 6) (A Commentary on the UNIX Operating System) who passed away in 1998.

Excellence in Research for Australia

Australian Research Council's Excellence in Research for Australia initiative results for World-Class Research in Information Technology 
2020/21: Ranked first in Australia in the Times Higher Education World University Rankings 
2018/19: Shared first with ANU for Computer Software
2018/19: Maintained a rating of 5 for broad research fields of Engineering and Information and Computing Sciences
2013: Only Australian University to achieve a rank of 5 (the highest ranking) in Computer Software
2011: Broadest range (5 areas, the next highest was only in 2 areas) in Australia

Rankings

School Achievements

Student projects 
 

Students of the School are involved in a number of high-profile projects, including: 
 rUNSWift, the University's team in the international RoboCup Standard Platform League competition, is the most successful team in the world, with wins in 2000, 2001, 2003, 2014 and 2015, as well as coming second in 1999, 2002, 2005 and 2010.

 Sunswift Solar Cars 
 2018: Guinness World Record with car "VIolet" - Lowest Energy Consumption Driving Trans-Australia (Perth to Sydney) - Electric Car.
 2014:  FIA Land Speed Record with car "Sunswift eVe" - Sunswift eVe breaks the record for the fastest electric car over 500 kilometres (310 mi), with an average speed of 107 kilometres per hour (66 mph). The previous record of 73 kilometres per hour (45 mph) was set in 1988.
 2011: Guinness World Record with car "Sunswift IVy" - Fastest Solar Powered Vehicle: 88.8 kilometres per hour (55.2 mph).
 2009: Winner of the Silicon Challenge Class at the Global Green Challenge with the car "Sunswift IVy".
 BLUEsat Satellite 
 2018: 8th in the European Rover Challenge (ERC)

Student competitions

Computing facilities 
The School has computer laboratories for coursework teaching and student projects, including a number of specialist laboratories. The network supports well in excess of 1000 computers for teaching, research and administration.

 300+ Intel-based computers running Linux in 13 generic teaching laboratories; Microsoft Windows is available 'virtualized' in all Linux labs
 20 AppleOS computers reserved in a specialized teaching laboratory
 40 Linux computers in laboratories reserved for thesis students
 1200+ computing sessions available in a 'virtualized' lab environment
 150+ heterogeneous computers dedicated to post-grad research students
 10+ discrete GPU servers for deep-learning research
 40+ discrete CPU servers available in Linux clusters for research
 Virtual Reality lab 
 laptop locker 
 1 multi-host vSphere production cluster with dedicated 60TB SAN
 100 virtualized servers for academic staff teaching and research requirements
 1 multi-host vSphere research cluster with dedicated 20TB SAN
 30 virtualized servers for dedicated and ad-hoc research requirements
 30+ heterogeneous computers for administration and systems support
 extensive backup infrastructure, utilizing incremental and full backup to tape

The School is committed to a regular cycle of upgrades and invests heavily to maintain a state-of-the-art IT environment.

UNSW Sydney has a very high capacity, free, wireless Internet service for all students and staff.

References

External links 
 Facebook
 LinkedIn
 UNSW Computer Science and Engineering website
UNSW Faculty of Engineering website

Schools of the University of New South Wales